The 1913–14 season was Manchester United's 22nd season in the Football League and seventh in the First Division.

First Division

FA Cup

References

Manchester United F.C. seasons
Manchester United